Kowloon Rock is an island in the middle of Kowloon Bay in Hong Kong, near the runway of the former Kai Tak Airport. Administratively, it is part of Kowloon City District. The rock has no vegetation, as it is a rock. An isolated danger daymark is installed to alert passing vessels.

The island is now sheltered in the To Kwa Wan typhoon shelter by a dyke across the bay.

References

External links

Heritage Assets for Preservation/Enhancement
Picture of Kowloon Rock

Uninhabited islands of Hong Kong
Kowloon City District
Islands of Hong Kong